Fernando Andina (born 22 May 1976 in Madrid) is a Spanish actor.

He studied drama in the United States and Spain and his first main role was in the TV-series Al salir de clase

Filmography
 El Palo (2001), by Eva Lesmes.
 Más de mil cámaras velan por tu seguridad (2003), by David Alonso
 El último alquimista (2005), by Nicolás Caicoya.
 El ciclo Dreyer (2006), by Álvaro del Amo.

Short films 
 Gatos (2002), by Toni Bestard and Adán Martín

Television 
 Al salir de clase (2000-2001). (Telecinco).
 El comisario (2002-2009). (Telecinco).
 Sin tetas no hay paraíso (2009). (Telecinco).
 Gavilanes (2010-2011). (Antena 3).
 Física o Química (2011). (Antena 3).

Theatre
 Hillbillie wedding
 Aspirina para dos
 Annie get your gun
 Los engranajes
 Tierra de nadie

References

External links
 
  www.teleindiscreta.orange.es

1976 births
Living people
Male actors from Madrid
Spanish male film actors
Spanish male stage actors
Spanish male television actors
21st-century Spanish male actors